Shioda (written: 塩田) is a Japanese surname. Notable people with the surname include:

, Japanese martial artist
, Japanese mathematician
Shioda modular surface
, Japanese martial artist

Japanese-language surnames